1st Visual Effects Society Awards
February 19, 2003

Best Visual Effects - Motion Picture: 
The Lord of the Rings: The Two Towers

The 1st Visual Effects Society Awards, given on February 19, 2003 at the Skirball Cultural Center, honored the best visual effects in film and television from 2002.

Winners and nominees
(Winners in bold)

Film

Television

References

External links
 Visual Effects Society

2002
Visual Effects Society Awards
Visual Effects Society Awards
Visual Effects Society Awards
Visual Effects Society Awards